In Ireland and Scotland broken men were clansmen who no longer had any allegiance to their original clan, and might be outlaws.

Notes

References

Highlands and Islands of Scotland
Scottish society
Social history of Ireland